Carlos Salinas (born 12 October 1938) is a Peruvian footballer. He competed in the men's tournament at the 1960 Summer Olympics.

References

External links
 

1938 births
Living people
Peruvian footballers
Peru international footballers
Olympic footballers of Peru
Footballers at the 1960 Summer Olympics
People from Ica, Peru
Association football goalkeepers